Precious Family (lit. Letters to My Parents) is a South Korean television series starring Kim Hee-ae, Heo Joon-ho, Song Jae-ho, Kim Hae-sook, Jang Hyun-sung, Lee Dong-wook, and Lee Yu-ri. It aired on KBS2 from October 16, 2004 to July 5, 2005 on Saturdays and Sundays at 19:55 for 68 episodes.

Shedding light on the importance of family and marriage through the realistic portrayal of one woman who experiences many trials in her life including her husband's infidelity, friction with difficult in-laws, and the hardship of raising an autistic son, the drama received solid ratings and critical approval.

Plot
The insurmountable responsibility cast upon parents with mentally challenged offspring can be quite daunting. For Chang-soo (Heo Joon-ho), father of a young daughter and an autistic son (Yoo Seung-ho), the pressure was too much. He ends up cheating on his wife Sung-shil (Kim Hee-ae) with another woman, and eventually the two split up. Despite feeling society's double standards where the responsibility of childcare often falls on the mother's shoulders, Sung-shil re-enters the workforce.

Meanwhile, the bitterness of divorce soon brings Chang-soo to realize the preciousness of family and his love for his two children. Full of regrets and desire for redemption, Chang-soo approaches Sung-shil in hopes of rekindling their love. Just then, Chang-soo faces another fallback in his life as his company nears bankruptcy. The decision is now up to Sung-shil—she must decide whether to turn her back on the man who once stabbed her in the heart, or to embrace the changed man that he has become over the years.

Cast
Song Jae-ho as Ahn Jae-hyo 
Kim Hae-sook as Kim Ok-hwa 
Kim Hee-ae as Ahn Sung-shil
Jang Hyun-sung as Ahn Ji-hwan 
Lee Dong-wook as Ahn Jung-hwan 
Lee Yu-ri as Ahn Sung-mi
Kim Bo-yeon as Ahn Geum-joo 
Huh Joon-ho as Park Chang-soo
Park Ji-mi as Park Soo-a h
Yoo Seung-ho as Park Joon-yi 
Lee Chan as Jung-hwan's sidekick
Jung Joon as Lee Hyung-pyo 
Song Seon-mi as Song Ah-ri  
Lee Min-young as Woo Mi-yeon 
Kim Yong-gun as Mi-yeon's father, taxi driver
Kim Dong-joo as Mi-yeon's mom, runs a restaurant
Bang Eun-hee as Myung-sook 
Jung Wook as Ah-ri's father
Na Moon-hee
Choi Si-won

References

External links
Precious Family official KBS website 

Korean-language television shows
2004 South Korean television series debuts
2005 South Korean television series endings
Korean Broadcasting System television dramas
Television shows written by Kim Soo-hyun (writer)
South Korean romance television series
Television series by Samhwa Networks